Alkam (also Romanized as Ālkām; also known as Ālkām-e Lotowm) is a village in Dinachal Rural District, Pareh Sar District, Rezvanshahr County, Gilan Province, Iran. At the 2006 census, its population was 1,733, in 450 families.

References 

Populated places in Rezvanshahr County